The 1948 Progressive Conservative leadership election was held to choose a leader for the Progressive Conservative Party of Canada.  The convention was held at the Ottawa Coliseum in Ottawa, Ontario, Canada. Voting occurred on October 2, 1948. Premier of Ontario George A. Drew was elected as the party's new leader. The National Film Board of Canada made a short film about the event for its Eye Witness series.

Background
John Bracken had been leader of the party since 1942 but did not enter parliament until the 1945 federal election in which the Liberal government was re-elected despite an increase in seats for the Progressive Conservatives. Unable to impress his leadership on the parliamentary party, which viewed him as an outsider, he was persuaded to step down as leader in 1948.

Candidates
George A. Drew, 54, had been Premier of Ontario since 1943.
John Diefenbaker, 53, the Member of Parliament (MP) for Lake Centre, Saskatchewan since 1940, announced his second bid for the leadership having run unsuccessfully in 1942. He had support from western delegates but was unpopular in Quebec.
Donald Fleming, 43, MP for the Toronto riding of Eglinton since 1945

Grey North (Ontario) MP W. Garfield Case ended his candidacy before the convention to support Drew.

Convention
Policies considered by delegates including tax relief, a ban on communist activities, abolishing an annual $2.50 radio licence fee, reducing the cost of government, strengthened defence, a long-term immigration policy, a national flag, and a national library.

Drew's speech to delegates received more applause than Diefenbaker's. The Ontario premier called for stronger ties between Quebec and English Canada, warned against centralization of power in Ottawa and favoured personal initiative, saving, and security.

Fleming warned of the "cancer of Communism in our midst (that) must be fought without quarter by every democratic weapon open to a free people" and accused the Liberals of surrendering to socialist economics. He argued that Quebec was essential for the party's success.

Diefenbaker said the party needed more support from what he called the "forgotten man" arguing that "They want leadership that will assert that decent living cannot come from government handouts; they know that government cannot take the place of fundamental virtues of honest, thrift, hard work, tolerance and sympathy... I believe that progress can be achieved by free enterprise rather than through the muddling interference of bureaucrats."

Results
Whereas the party's previous leadership conventions had for the most part been highly contested, few expected this convention to be anything other than a coronation for Drew, who many had identified as a potential national party leader after the popularity of his provincial government in Ontario helped the Tories to a major breakthrough in the province at the 1945 election. In the end, while Diefenbaker was able to attract some support from the west, Drew scored an overwhelming victory on the first ballot.

Wilfrid Garfield Case announced his candidacy but withdrew before the convention to support Drew.

References

1948
1948 elections in Canada
Progressive Conservative leadership convention